Thiri Thu Ketha Dewi (18?? – 1882), commonly known as Pin Hteik Khaung Tin, was a Devi-level royal princess during the late Konbaung dynasty. She was one of the three virgin daughters of King Mindon.

Life
Pin Princess, the second of four siblings,  was born to King Mindon and his consort Zabwedaung Mibaya. Her eldest sister and youngest brother died at their young ages; only her younger sister Momeik Princess survived.

At the opening ceremony of King Mindon's royal palace (ဥကင်တော်ဖွင့်မင်္ဂလာ) in 1854, she was granted the title of Thiri Thu Ketha Wadi, and later promoted to Thiri Thu Ketha Dewi. She was granted the appanages of Moe Hlaing. When her mother died in 1857, she received the appanage of Pin and was hence known as Pin Hteik Khaung Tin. She and her sister were adopted by Setkya Dewi since their mother's death.

Pin Princess was married to Mekkhaya Prince in 1863, but the marriage was not consummated since he had already about six concubines; this led to dissatisfaction on her part and a later divorce.

Pin Princess died in 1882.

References

Konbaung dynasty
1882 deaths
Burmese Buddhists
Burmese princesses